The Light Shines in the Darkness is an unfinished play by Leo Tolstoy, written in 1890.
Arguably his most autobiographical piece, the play is said to "mirror Leo Tolstoy’s highly personal dilemma as if seen through the crucible of the family. "

External Links

 English Text
 The Light Shines in the Darkness, at RevoltLib.com
 The Light Shines in the Darkness, at Marxists.org
 The Light Shines in the Darkness, at TheAnarchistLibrary.org
 The Light Shines in the Darkness, at Archive.org

References

Plays by Leo Tolstoy
1890 plays